Charles Louis de Lorraine (21 October 1696 – 2 November 1755) was a French nobleman and general, member of a cadet branch of the House of Lorraine. He held the titles of Count of Marsan, lord of Pons and prince of Mortagne-sur-Gironde, but he was known by the courtesy title of Prince of Pons.

Biography

Born to Charles de Lorraine, Count of Marsan and his wife Catherine Thérèse de Goyon de Matignon, he was the couples eldest child. Styled the Prince of Pons from birth, he was also the Count of Marsan at his father's death in November 1708. As a member of the House of Lorraine, he was a Foreign Prince and as such, was addressed with the style of Highness. His mother was the first wife of Jean Baptiste Colbert, Marquis of Seignelay and as such, Charles Louis had four half siblings.

Through his mother, he was a first cousin of Jacques I, Prince of Monaco, the spouse of Louise Hippolyte, Princess of Monaco He was also the Prince of Mortagne.

He married Élisabeth de Roquelaure, a daughter of Antoine Gaston de Roquelaure. The couple were married on 1 March 1714. Élisabeth gave him four children, two sons and two daughters. His younger daughter Louise married into the Duke of Bouillons family and his eldest son Gaston married a princess of the House of Rohan. His youngest son married a daughter of the Duke of Nevers. Only his daughter Louise had further issue.

The Prince of Pons pursued a military career:  in 1717 he was posted in Hungary. On 3 June 1724, he was made a knight of the Order of the Holy Spirit, the most prestigious decoration of the Ancien régime. He was promoted to the rank of Brigadier in 1734, then maréchal de camp (Major General) in 1738 and finally Lieutenant General in 1744. His first son was his aide de camp in the 1736 campaign, his second one in the 1741-1742 campaign

He outlived his wife by three years. He was buried at the Catacombs of Paris.

Issue

Leopoldine Élisabeth de Lorraine (2 October 1716 – ?) never married;
Louise Henriette Gabrielle de Lorraine, Mademoiselle de Marsan, Duchess of Bouillon (30 December 1718 – 5 September 1788) married Godefroy de La Tour d'Auvergne and had issue;
Gaston Jean Baptiste Charles de Lorraine, Count of Marsan (7 February 1721 – 2 May 1743) married Marie Louise de Rohan; died of smallpox;
Louis Camille de Lorraine, Prince of Marsan, Prince of Puyguilhem (18 December 1725 – 12 April 1780) married Hélène Julie Rosalie Mancini, Mademoiselle de Nevers, no issue.

Ancestry

References and notes

House of Lorraine
1696 births
House of Guise
1755 deaths
18th-century French people
17th-century French people
People of the Regency of Philippe d'Orléans
People of the Ancien Régime
Princes of Lorraine
Counts of Marsan